Samuel Collier Major (July 2, 1869 – July 28, 1931) was a U.S. representative from Missouri.

Born in Fayette, Missouri, Major attended the public schools and Central College at Fayette. He was graduated from St. James Military Academy, Macon, Missouri, in 1888. He studied law and was admitted to the bar in 1890 and commenced practice in Fayette, Missouri.

He was appointed prosecuting attorney of Howard County in 1892 and later was elected to the office for two terms. He served in the Missouri Senate in 1907–1911. He was an unsuccessful candidate for election in 1916 to the Sixty-fifth Congress.

Major was elected as a Democrat to the Sixty-sixth Congress (March 4, 1919 – March 3, 1921). He was an unsuccessful candidate for reelection in 1920 to the Sixty-seventh Congress and resumed the practice of law in Fayette, Missouri.

Major was elected to the Sixty-eighth, Sixty-ninth, and Seventieth Congresses (March 4, 1923 – March 3, 1929).
He was an unsuccessful candidate for reelection in 1928 to the Seventy-first Congress.

Major was elected to the Seventy-second Congress and served from March 4, 1931, until his death in Fayette, Missouri, July 28, 1931. He was interred in Fayette City Cemetery.

See also
 List of United States Congress members who died in office (1900–49)

References

1869 births
1931 deaths
Democratic Party Missouri state senators
Central Methodist University alumni
Democratic Party members of the United States House of Representatives from Missouri
People from Fayette, Missouri